Michel Dighneef (20 December 1936 – 5 December 2017) was a Belgian footballer and politician.

A native of Tilleur, Saint-Nicolas in  Liège, Dighneef was born in 1936. During his football career, he often played centre-back for his hometown team, R.F.C. Tilleur. After his retirement from football, Dighneef, a member of Parti Socialiste, served in the Senate from 1991 to 1995, when he was elected to the Chamber of Representatives. Dighneef stepped down as  representative in 1999 and died on 5 December 2017, aged 80.

References

1936 births
2017 deaths
Footballers from Liège
Belgian footballers
Socialist Party (Belgium) politicians
Members of the Chamber of Representatives (Belgium)
Members of the Senate (Belgium)
Association football central defenders
Belgian sportsperson-politicians
People from Saint-Nicolas, Liège
R.F.C. Tilleur players
Politicians from Liège